The Welsh Footballer of the Year is an annual award chosen by the FAW, to determine the best player in Wales.

Winners

Men

Women

See also

 List of sports awards honoring women

References

Association football player of the year awards by nationality
Annual events in Wales
Football in Wales
Women's association football player of the year awards